The Ernest Orlando Lawrence Award was established in 1959 in honor of a scientist who helped elevate American physics to the status of world leader in the field.

E. O. Lawrence was the inventor of the cyclotron, an accelerator of subatomic particles, and a 1939 Nobel Laureate in physics for that achievement. The Radiation Laboratory he developed at Berkeley during the 1930s ushered in the era of "big science", in which experiments were no longer done by an individual researcher and a few assistants on the table-top of an academic lab but by large, multidisciplinary teams of scientists and engineers in entire buildings full of sophisticated equipment and huge scientific machines. During World War II, Lawrence and his accelerators contributed to the Manhattan Project, and he later played a leading role in establishing the U.S. system of national laboratories, two of which (Lawrence Berkeley and Lawrence Livermore) now bear his name.

Shortly after Lawrence's death in August 1958, John A. McCone, Chairman of the United States Atomic Energy Commission, wrote to President Eisenhower suggesting the establishment of a memorial award in Lawrence's name. President Eisenhower agreed, saying, "Such an award would seem to me to be most fitting, both as a recognition of what he has given to our country and to mankind, and as a means of helping to carry forward his work through inspiring others to dedicate their lives and talents to scientific effort." The first Lawrence Awards were given in 1960.

The Ernest Orlando Lawrence Award is bestowed by the Secretary of the U.S. Department of Energy to mid-career scientists and engineers in recognition of exceptional scientific, technical, and/or engineering achievements related to the broad missions of the U.S. Department of Energy and its programs. The Lawrence Award is administered by the Department of Energy's Office of Science.

Each Lawrence Award recipient receives a citation signed by the Secretary of Energy, a gold medal bearing the likeness of Ernest Orlando Lawrence, and a $20,000 honorarium.

Nomination and selection procedures
The Ernest Orlando Lawrence Awards honor scientists and engineers, at mid-career, showing promise for the future, for exceptional contributions in research and development supporting the U.S. Department of Energy and its mission to advance the national economic and energy security of the United States.

Beginning in 2011, the awards are given annually. One Lawrence Award is given in each of the following eight fields:

 Atomic, Molecular, and Chemical Sciences
 Biological and Environmental Sciences
 Computer, Information, and Knowledge Sciences
 Condensed Matter and Materials Sciences
 Energy Science and Innovation
 Fusion and Plasma Sciences
 High Energy and Nuclear Physics
 National Security and Nonproliferation

The objectives of the Ernest Orlando Lawrence Awards are:

 to encourage excellence in energy science and technology;
 to inspire people to dedicate their lives and talents to scientific and technological effort, through the examples of Ernest O. Lawrence and the Lawrence Award laureates; and
 to highlight for the general public the accomplishments of the U.S. scientific and technological communities associated with the U.S. Department of Energy.

Criteria
Eligibility for the Lawrence Award requires that all recipients:

 be in the middle of their careers, defined as within 20 years of earning their highest degree*;
 be citizens of the United States;
 be recognized for achievement in research principally funded by the U.S. Department of Energy; and
 be assessed primarily on the scientific impact and technical significance of their work relative to its discipline and/or related mission. (Business management and stewardship acumen, while valued, is not a significant qualification factor used when evaluating a nominee's worthiness.)

Nomination materials
Nomination is made by a letter of justification, curriculum vitae, a statement explaining the nominee's connection to DOE support, a no more than 35 word citation, a bibliography of significant publications, and identifying the award category of the nominee (Atomic, Molecular, and Chemical Sciences; Biological and Environmental Sciences; Computer, Information, and Knowledge Sciences; Condensed Matter and Materials Sciences; Energy Science and Innovation; Fusion and Plasma Sciences; High Energy and Nuclear Physics; or National Security and Nonproliferation). An individual's nomination is limited to a single category.

Selection
The nomination materials for all eligible nominees are objectively studied by independent peer review panels, one for each of eight award categories, and if worthy candidate(s) are identified in the peer review, selection recommendations based upon these findings are made by Federal Program Officials. A concurrence request for any awardees is made to the Secretary of Energy, who holds final discretion over any selection(s).

The reviewers are not empanelled as a Federal Advisory Committee. The identity of all nominators, all nominees, and all peer review panelists remain anonymous. DOE employees must comply with regulations governing conduct of employees codified in 10 CFR Part 1010 and Standards of Ethical Conduct for Employees of the Executive Branch at 5 CFR §2635.

Award laureates
1960
Hendrik Wade Bode
Harvey Brooks
John S. Foster Jr.
Isadore Perlman
Norman F. Ramsey Jr.
Alvin M. Weinberg

1961
Leo Brewer
Henry Hurwitz Jr.
Conrad L. Longmire
Wolfgang K. H. Panofsky
Kenneth E. Wilzbach

1962
Andrew A. Benson
Richard Feynman
Herbert Goldstein
Anthony L. Turkevich
Herbert F. York

1963
Herbert J.C. Kouts
L. James Rainwater
Louis Rosen
James M. Taub
Cornelius A. Tobias

1964
Jacob Bigeleisen
Albert L. Latter
Harvey M. Patt
Marshall N. Rosenbuth
Theos J. Thompson

1965
George A. Cowan
Floyd L. Culler
Milton C. Edlund
Theodore B. Taylor
Arthur C. Upton

1966
Harold M. Agnew
Ernest C. Anderson
Murray Gell-Mann
John R. Huizenga
Paul R. Vanstrum

1967
Mortimer M. Elkind
John M. Googin
Allen F. Henry
John O. Rasmussen
Robert N. Thorn

1968
James R. Arnold
E. Richard Cohen
Val L. Fitch
Richard Latter
John B. Storer

1969
Geoffrey F. Chew
Don T. Cromer
Ely M. Gelbard
F. Newton Hayes
John H. Nuckolls

1970
William J. Bair
James W. Cobble
Joseph M. Hendrie
Michael M. May
Andrew M. Sessler

1971
Thomas B. Cook
Robert L. Fleischer
Robert L. Hellens
P. Buford Price
Robert M. Walker

1972
Charles C. Cremer
Sidney D. Drell
Marvin Goldman
David A. Shirley
Paul F. Zweifel

1973
Louis Baker
Seymour Sack
Thomas E. Wainwright
James Robert Weir
Sheldon Wolff

1974
Joseph Cerny
Harold Paul Furth
Henry C. Honeck
Charles A. McDonald
Chester R.Richmond

1975
Evan H. Appelman
Charles E. Elderkin
William A. Lokke
Burton Richter
Samuel C. C. Ting

1976
A. Philip Bray
James W. Cronin
Kaye D. Lathrop
Adolphus L. Lotts
Edwin D. McClanahan

1977
James D. Bjorken
John L. Emmett
F. William Studier
Gareth Thomas
Dean A. Waters

1980
Donald W. Barr
B. Grant Logan
Nicholas P. Samios
Benno P. Schoenborn
Charles D. Scott

1981
Martin Blume
Yuan Tseh Lee
Fred R. Mynatt
Paul B. Selby
Lowell L. Wood

1982
George F. Chapline, Jr.
Mitchell J. Feigenbaum
Michael J. Lineberry
Nicholas Turro
Raymond E. Wildung

1983
James Frederick Jackson
Michael E. Phelps
Paul H. Rutherford
Mark S. Wrighton
George B. Zimmerman

1984
Robert W. Conn
John J. Dunn
Peter L. Hagelstein
Siegfried S. Hecker
Robert B. Laughlin
Kenneth N. Raymond

1985
Anthony P. Malinauskas
William H. Miller
David R. Nygren
Gordon C. Osbourn
Betsy Sutherland
Thomas A. Weaver

1986
James J. Duderstadt
Helen T. Edwards
Joe W. Gray
C. Bradley Moore
Gustavus J. Simmons
James L. Smith

1987
James W. Gordon
Miklos Gyulassy
Sung-Hou Kim
James L. Kinsey
J. Robert Merriman
David E. Moncton

1988
Mary K. Gaillard
Richard T. Lahey, Jr.
Chain Tsuan Liu
Gene H. McCall
Alexander Pines
Joseph S. Wall

1990
John J. Dorning
James R. Norris
S. Thomas Picraux
Wayne J. Shotts
Maury Tigner
F. Ward Whicker

1991
Zachary Fisk
Richard Fortner
Rulon Linford
Peter Schultz
Richard E. Smalley
J. Pace Vandevender

1993
James G. Anderson
Robert G. Bergman
Alan R. Bishop
Yoon I. Chang
Robert K. Moyzis
John W. Shaner
Carl Wieman

1994
John D. Boice, Jr.
E. Michael Campbell
Gregory J. Kubas
Edward William Larsen
John D. Lindl
Gerard M. Ludtka
George F. Smoot
John E. Till

1996
Charles R. Alcock
Mina J. Bissell
Thom H. Dunning, Jr.
Charles V. Jakowatz, Jr.
Sunil K. Sinha
Theofanis G. Theofanous
Jorge Luis Valdes

1998
Dan Gabriel Cacuci
Joanna S. Fowler
Laura H. Greene
Neil P. Kelly
Steven E. Koonin
Mark H. Thiemens
Ahmed H. Zewail

2002
C. Jeffrey Brinker
Claire M. Fraser
Bruce T. Goodwin
Keith O. Hodgson
Saul Perlmutter
Benjamin D. Santer
Paul J. Turinsky

2004
Richard B. Elkind
Nathaniel J. Fisch
Bette Korber
Claire Ellen Max
Fred N. Mortensen
Richard J. Saykally
Ivan K. Schuller
Gregory W. Swift

2006
Paul Alivisatos and Moungi Bawendi,  Materials Research
Malcolm J. Andrews, National Security
Arup K. Chakraborty, Life Sciences
My Hang V. Huynh, Chemistry
Marc Kamionkowski, Physics
John Zachara, Environmental Science and Technology
Steven Zinkle, Nuclear Technology

2009
Joan F. Brennecke
William Dorland
Omar Hurricane
Wim Leemans
Zhi-Xun Shen
Sunney Xie

2011
Riccardo Betti
Paul C. Canfield
Mark B. Chadwick
David E. Chavez
Amit Goyal
Thomas P. Guilderson
Lois Curfman McInnes
Bernard Matthew Poelker
Barry F. Smith

2013
Adam P. Arkin
Siegfried H. Glenzer
Stephen C. Myers
John L. Sarrao
John C. Wagner
Margaret S. Wooldridge

2014
Mei Bai
Carolyn R. Bertozzi
Pavel Bochev
Eric E. Dors
Christopher L. Fryer
David J. Schlegel
Brian D. Wirth
Peidong Yang
Jizhong (Joe) Zhou

2020
Yi Cui
Dana M. Dattelbaum
Dustin H. Froula
M. Zahid Hasan
Daniel Kasen
Robert B. Ross
Susannah G. Tringe
Krista S. Walton

2021
Matthew C. Beard
Luis Chacón
Andrew J. Landahl
Jennifer Pett-Ridge
Sofia Quaglioni
Philip C. Schuster and Natalia Toro
Rachel A. Segalman
Daniel B. Sinars
Jie Xiao

External links
 Ernest Orlando Lawrence Award website

1960 establishments in the United States
Awards established in 1960
American science and technology awards
United States Department of Energy